Keyway may refer to:
A part of a keyed joint used to connect a rotating machine element to a shaft; see key (engineering)
A keyhole, a hole or aperture (as in a door or lock) for receiving a key; see lock and key

See also
Keyway Air Transport, a defunct American military contractor
Keyhole (disambiguation)